Ging is a film produced in the Philippines and released in 1964. The film is in the Filipino and Tagalog languages.

The title of the movie is a feminine name.

The film is a family drama and was released by People's Pictures on January 20, 1964. It was directed by Cirio H. Santiago and Teodorico C Santos. The film is based on a comic by Mars Ravelo and Elpidio Torres in the Liwayway Magazine.

Cast of characters

Vilma Santos
José Padilla, Jr.
Olivia Cenizal 
Carol Varga
Ramon d'Salva
Aruray
Ponga
Etang Discher 
Georgie Quizon
Jose Garcia
Paquito Salcedo
Eva Montes

External links
 

Philippine drama films
1964 films
Tagalog-language films
Live-action films based on comics
Philippine films based on comics
Films based on Philippine comics
Films directed by Cirio H. Santiago